Canadian federal elections have provided the following results in Newfoundland and Labrador.

Regional profile
Newfoundland and Labrador has been a Liberal heartland since it joined Canada in 1949, with only the city of St. John's electing Progressive Conservatives on a relatively consistent basis in the past, though that support shifted to the NDP and Liberal parties in 2006 and to the NDP in the 2008 elections. Even in the 1984 Mulroney landslide, more rural and remote seats went Liberal than PC. The Conservatives picked up one seat in the 2006 election, but the Liberals still held a majority of the seats. Party preference here has a lot to do with religion, where Catholics tend to vote Conservative and Protestants Liberal (contrary to the rest of the country).

In 2008, the Anything But Conservative movement took hold here and the Conservatives lost all their seats to the Liberals and NDP.

In the 2011 election, Newfoundland and Labrador was the only province to have the Liberals win in terms of popular vote. They however did lose 2 seats, 1 to the Tories and one to the NDP.

In the 2015 election, Newfoundland and Labrador's Liberal slant was taken to a new level, with Justin Trudeau's Liberals capturing every seat in the province (as well as all other Atlantic provinces), most by landslide majorities. In Bonavista—Burin—Trinity, they received 81.78% of the vote – the highest share obtained by any party in any riding in 2015.

In the 2019 election, the NDP recaptured St. John's East while the other 6 seats all stayed Liberal.

In the 2021 election, the Liberal Party of Canada won 6 out 7 ridings in Newfoundland and Labrador including re-capturing the NDP's St. John's East riding. The Conservative Party of Canada was successful in winning the Liberal riding of Coast of Bays—Central—Notre Dame. Finally, the NDP were shut-out of NL.

Representation history by area

2021 - 44th General Election

2019 - 43rd General Election 

|-
| style="background-color:whitesmoke" |Avalon
||
|Kenneth McDonald19,12246.26%
|
|Matthew Chapman12,85531.10%
|
|Lea Mary Movelle7,14217.28%
|
|Greg Malone2,2155.36%
|
|
||
|Ken McDonald (politician)|Ken McDonald
|-
| style="background-color:whitesmoke" |Bonavista—Burin—Trinity
||
|Churence Rogers14,70745.70%
|
|Sharon Vokey12,69739.46%
|
|Matthew Cooper3,85511.98%
|
|Kelsey Reichel9202.86%
|
|
||
|Churence Rogers
|-
| style="background-color:whitesmoke" |Coast of Bays—Central—Notre Dame 
||
|Scott Simms16,51448.31%
|
|Alex Bracci12,08135.34%
|
|Noel Joe4,22412.36%
|
|Byron White1,3633.99%
|
|
||
|Scott Simms
|-
| style="background-color:whitesmoke" |Labrador
||
|Yvonne Jones4,85142.48%
|
|Larry Flemming3,54831.07%
|
|Michelene Gray2,79624.49%
|
|Tyler Colbourne2241.96%
|
|
||
|Yvonne Jones
|-
| style="background-color:whitesmoke" |Long Range Mountains
||
|Gudie Hutchings18,19947.36%
|
|Josh Eisses10,87328.30%
|
|Holly Pike7,60919.80%
|
|Lucas Knill1,3343.47%
|
|Robert Miles (VCP)4111.07%
||
|Gudie Hutchings
|-
| style="background-color:whitesmoke" |St. John's East
|
|Nick Whalen14,96233.20%
|
|Joedy Wall8,14118.06%
||
|Jack Harris21,14846.92%
|
|David Peters8211.82%
|
|
||
|Nick Whalen
|-
| style="background-color:whitesmoke" |St. John's South—Mount Pearl
||
|Seamus O'Regan20,79351.13%
|
|Terry Martin7,76719.10%
|
|Anne Marie Anonsen10,89026.78%
|
|Alexandra Hayward7401.82%
|
|David Jones (CHP)1410.35%Benjamin Ruckpaul (PPC)3350.82%
||
|Seamus O'Regan
|}

2015 - 42nd General Election

2011 - 41st General Election

2008 - 40th General Election

2006 - 39th General Election
The Liberals won four seats and the Conservatives three. The open Avalon seat changed hands from the Liberals to the Tories. The seat had been held by Natural Resources Minister John Efford, who had retired. Otherwise, there was little change from the previous election.

2004 - 38th General Election
One of the biggest questions of the 2004 election was whether the new Conservative Party of Canada could match the old federal PC Party's level of support in Atlantic Canada. With Newfoundland and Labrador's provincial PC government unpopular over mandating an end to the previous year's public service strike, any province-wide success for 2004 was seen as unlikely.  The Conservatives lost one of their three seats (previously gained in a byelection) and held their rump in St. John's.  Des McGrath was seen as the NDP's best chance of electing a candidate in the province in several decades, but he still fell nearly 4000 votes short of winning Random—Burin—St. George's.

2000 - 37th General Election

Notes

References

Elections in Newfoundland and Labrador
Canadian federal election results